The following lists events that happened during 1884 in South Africa.

Incumbents
 Governor of the Cape of Good Hope and High Commissioner for Southern Africa: Hercules Robinson.
 Governor of the Colony of Natal: Henry Ernest Gascoyne Bulwer.
 State President of the Orange Free State: Jan Brand.
 State President of the South African Republic: Paul Kruger.
 Prime Minister of the Cape of Good Hope: Thomas Charles Scanlen (until 12 May), Thomas Upington (starting 12 May).

Events

April
 24 – Germany occupies German South-West Africa.

July
 24 – Barberton is declared a town.

August
 5 – The Republic of Vryheid is established in northern Natal.
 7 – Walvisbaai is occupied by the Cape Colony.

November
 3 – Imvo Zabantsundu (Xhosa: The Native People's Opinion of South Africa), South Africa's first newspaper by and for Black people, is founded by John Tengo Jabavu in King William's Town.
 15 – The Berlin Conference commences when 14 countries (Austria-Hungary, Belgium, Denmark, France, Germany, Great Britain, Italy, Netherlands, Portugal, Russia, Spain, Sweden-Norway, Turkey, and United States of America) meet in Berlin to each claim their part of Africa.

December
 1 – The private Kowie Railway line between Grahamstown and Port Alfred is opened to traffic.

Births
Rolland Beaumont  cricketer

Deaths
 8 February – Zulu king Cetshwayo. (b. 1826)

Railways

Railway lines opened

 31 March – Cape Midland – Noupoort to De Aar, to link up with the Cape Western System, .
 May – Natal – Pietermaritzburg to Merrivale, .
 16 September – Cape Eastern – Sterkstroom to Molteno, .
 3 November – Cape Western – Victoria West Road to Oranjerivier, .
 1 December – Kowie – Port Alfred to Grahamstown, .

Locomotives
 The Cape Government Railways places two experimental 3rd Class 4-4-0 tender and four experimental 4th Class 4-6-0 tank-and-tender locomotives in service, designed by the Cape Eastern System to be able to use the low-grade local coal with its high content of incombustible matter.

References

History of South Africa